Bruce W. Hodgins (January 29, 1931 – August 8, 2019) was a Canadian academic historian and author.

He was a co-founder of Trent University's history department, a federal New Democratic Party candidate, and a co-founder of the Canadian Canoe Museum.

He was the author of the 2003 book Blockades and resistance and the co-author of the 1989 book Temagami Experience.

Early life and education 
Bruce Hodgins was born on January 29, 1931, in Kitchener, Ontario. His father, Stanley Hodgins, was a school principle and his mother Laura Belle Hodgins (née Turel) was a nurse. He had a younger brother named Larry.

Hodgins studied at Waterloo College and Queen’s University at Kingston and had a PhD from Duke University in North Carolina where he attended from 1958.

Career 

Hodgins taught Canadian history and worked in the history departments of Prince of Wales College and at the University of Western Ontario as well as with Trent University's Leslie M. Frost Centre for Canadian Heritage and Development Studies. He was a specialist in the study of John Sandfield Macdonald, Temagami, Charles Alfred Marie Paradis [FR], the colonization of Canada, Camp Wanapitei, Canadian federalism, and his home town of Peterborough, Ontario. Along with Alan Wilson, he was a co-founder of Trent University's history department, where he worked as a professor from 1965, being promoted to associate professor in 1967. He retired in 1996.

Hodgins was the chair of the National Administrative Committee for the United Nations Association Canada. With John Jennings, Hodgins was a co-founder of the Canadian Canoe Museum.

Hodgins was the New Democratic Party candidate for Peterborough—Kawartha in the 1968 Canadian federal election, losing to Hugh Faulkner, and remaining an active party member throughout his adult life.

Hodgins won the Canadian Historical Association's Clio Award for the North in 2000.

Selected publications 
 Bruce Hodgins and Jamie Benidickson, Temagami Experience (1989) University of Toronto Press.
 Bruce Hodgins, Blockades and resistance: Studies in actions of peace and the Temagami blockades of 1988-89 (2003) Wilfrid Laurier University Press.
 The Canoe in Canadian Cultures/Bark, Skin and Cedar (1999) Natural Heritage/Natural History (co-editor with John Jennings and Doreen Small).
 Bruce Hodgins, Nastawgan: The Canadian North by Canoe and Snowshoe (1995) Betelgeuse Books
 Changing Parks: The History, Future and Cultural Context of Parks and Heritage Landscapes (1998) (co-editor) Toronto: Natural Heritage/Natural History Inc.

Personal life 
Hodgins met Carol, his wife-to-be, in Charlottetown, while working at the Prince of Wales College. They had sons Shawn and Geoff and daughter Gillian Nesbitt. He moved to Peterborough, Ontario in 1965 and lived on Engleburn Place.

Hodgins was a supporter of the Peterborough Historical Society. With other family members, he was a part owner of Camp Wanapitei, purchased in 1956.

Hodgins was one of over 300 people arrested in 1989 for taking part in a protest of a road expansion in Temagami.

Death 
Hodgins died on August 8, 2019, at Peterborough Regional Health Centre, aged 88, after what was presumed to be a series of small strokes.

See also 

 List of Canadian historians

References 

1931 births
2019 deaths
Writers from Kitchener, Ontario
People from Peterborough, Ontario
20th-century Canadian historians
21st-century Canadian historians
Historians from Ontario
Museum founders
New Democratic Party candidates for the Canadian House of Commons
20th-century Canadian writers
21st-century Canadian writers
Canadian book editors
Academic staff of Trent University
Duke University alumni
Queen's University at Kingston alumni
Wilfrid Laurier University alumni
Prince of Wales College
Academic staff of the University of Western Ontario